A non-binding referendum on electoral reform was held in the Canadian province of Prince Edward Island between 27 October – 7 November 2016. This was the second electoral reform referendum to be held in Prince Edward Island, following a vote to maintain the status quo in 2005. The referendum asked which of five voting systems residents would prefer to use in electing members to the Legislative Assembly of Prince Edward Island. The referendum involved four instant run-off counts and indicated mixed member proportional representation was the majority choice with 55.03% support on the final ballot, with support of 52.42% of votes cast. 

However, the plebiscite result was a product of a low voter turnout. Despite a variety of voting options and a long voting period, the final 36.46% turnout was very low by PEI standards. The province regularly gets more than 80% turnout in provincial general elections. 

Although he had set no threshold of minimum turnout for the plebiscite to be considered binding, Premier Wade MacLauchlan cited the low turnout as a factor in choosing not to proceed with immediate electoral reform. A third referendum on the subject was held in 2019.

Question
The official question on the ballot was:

"Rank the following electoral systems in your order of preference, 1 through 5 (with "1st Choice" being your most preferred and "5th choice" being your least preferred). You may choose as many, or as few, of the electoral system options as you want."

The options were listed alphabetically on the ballot as:
 Dual Member Proportional Representation
 First-Past-The-Post (the current system)
 First-Past-The-Post Plus Leaders
 Mixed Member Proportional Representation
 Preferential Voting (which in this case meant Instant-runoff voting).

Process of the vote count
The result of the plebiscite was found by using the Preferential Voting system, itself one of the options for elections being considered.
Voters were given the opportunity to rank the five options from most preferred to least preferred, although they did not have to rank all five options. If more than half of the voters chose one option as their first choice, that option won; if no option received a majority of first-choice votes, the winner was determined after vote transfers as per instant-runoff voting. The option with the fewest votes was dropped, and those ballots were distributed to the other options based on the second choice on those ballots. This was repeated as necessary until one option had a majority of the votes.

Results
No option received a majority in the First count. 
Vote transfers were used as per IRV, to establish a majority winner.
MMP took a majority of the votes in the 4th Count.

Prince Edward Island electoral reform referendum, 2016 

18,521 votes required to win in the first count.

(thereafter, a majority of the votes still in play was needed to win.)

In the 4th Count, the Mixed Member Proportional Representational option received a majority of the votes, followed by the existing first-past-the-post system.

Voting eligibility and methods
This plebiscite marked several firsts in Canadian electoral history. Sixteen- and seventeen-year-old PEI residents were permitted to vote on the grounds that they will be aged eighteen (and therefore eligible to vote under normal election rules) in the next provincial election, which would potentially be held using the voting system that wins this plebiscite. As well, plebiscite voters were able to submit their votes online or via touch-tone telephone for the first time in a major Canadian vote. Internet and telephone voting was open from 12:00 noon Saturday 29 October 2016 and ran until 7:00 p.m. on Monday, 7 November 2016. In-person voting was open in polling stations across the province on Friday, 4 November 2016, 4:00 p.m. - 9:00 p.m., and Saturday, 5 November 2016, 10:00 a.m. - 8:00 p.m.

Aftermath 
Premier Wade MacLauchlan said after the vote that he was doubtful the result of the referendum "can be said to constitute a clear expression of the will of Prince Edward Islanders" due to the unusually low turnout. MacLauchlan did commit to discussing the results when the provincial legislature resumed on 15 November 2016; noting the need to examine the urban and rural breakdown of votes, among other issues.

MacLauchlan's government introduced a motion in the Legislative Assembly of Prince Edward Island to hold a second referendum on electoral reform at the next provincial general election, stating that the low turnout for the referendum did not provide a mandate to implement the change and the need for a more specific referendum question with two choices. A motion by Green Party leader Peter Bevan-Baker to implement mixed-member proportional representation in line with the referendum results was defeated on 22 November 2016 by a vote of 6–20.

Subsequent referendum held in April 2019 

The next Prince Edward Island electoral reform referendum was held on 23 April 2019 simultaneously with the 66th Prince Edward Island general election. Results of this referendum were very close with 51.7% voting No and 48.3% voting Yes. Neither side met the conditions for the results to be considered binding. and prior to the next election the Island is debating reforms of this nature.

Notes

References

External links

Electoral reform referendum
Prince Edward Island electoral reform referendum
Prince Edward Island electoral reform referendum
Electoral reform referendums in Canada
Referendums in Prince Edward Island
Prince Edward Island electoral reform referendum
Prince Edward Island electoral reform referendum
Multiple-choice referendums